The FOG Project is a software project that implements FOG (Free and Open-source Ghost), a software tool that can deploy disk images of Microsoft Windows and Linux using the Preboot Execution Environment. It makes use of TFTP, the Apache webserver and iPXE. It is written in PHP.

The configuration tool developed by the FOG Project makes it possible to do remote system administration of the computers in a network. FOG depends on Partclone to copy the disk image.

See also 
 Windows Deployment Services
 Clonezilla

References

External links 

 

Disk cloning
Free software programmed in PHP